Jonathan Blake Evans (born October 10, 1981) is a former American football fullback who was a member of the Virginia Destroyers of the United Football League. He was signed by the Dallas Cowboys as an undrafted free agent in 2005. He played college football at Baylor.

Evans has also been a member of the San Diego Chargers, Tennessee Titans, Buffalo Bills, Houston Texans and Washington Redskins. He is the son of noted Christian author, speaker, and pastor Dr. Tony Evans.

He serves as chaplain for the Dallas Cowboys and as a motivational speaker, especially to youth.

References

External links
Baylor Bears bio
Houston Texans bio
Washington Redskins bio

1981 births
Living people
Players of American football from Dallas
American football tight ends
American football fullbacks
Baylor Bears football players
Dallas Cowboys players
San Diego Chargers players
Berlin Thunder players
Tennessee Titans players
Buffalo Bills players
Washington Redskins players
Houston Texans players
Virginia Destroyers players